A single–rail roller coaster is a roller coaster that only rides on one rail instead of the two that other roller coasters ride on.

Alpine/Mountain coasters 
 Besna Pehta -  Besna Pehta, Kranjska Gora, Upper Carniola 
 Bobová dráha -  Fun Park Žiarce, Pavčina Lehota, Žilina 
 Bobová dráha -  Ski Areál Kaste Petříkov, Ostružná, Olomouc 
 Clézy Gliss -  Clézy Gliss, Clécy, Normandy 
 Erlebnis-Rodelbahn Ruhla -  Erlebnis-Arena-Ruhla, Ruhla, Thuringia 
 Fisser Flitzer -  Sommer-Funpark Fiss, Fiss, Tyrol 
 Funbob –  Adventure Park Cimone, Sestola, Emilia-Romagna
 The Pipe Mountain Coaster –  Revelstoke Mountain Resort, Revelstoke, British Columbia
 Rail Runner -  Anakeesta, Gatlinburg, Tennessee
 Rowdy Bear Mountain Glider –  Rowdy Bear Mountain, Gatlinburg, Tennessee

Intamin

Rocky Mountain Construction

Skyline Attractions 

(*) = track produced by Rocky Mountain Construction

References

External links 

Roller coasters
 
Types of roller coaster